Sam Lynch (born 29 November 1975 in Limerick) is an Irish rower from St Michael's Rowing Club. He was a member of the Irish rowing team at the 1996 and 2004 Olympics.

Lynch is a doctor. His wife Sinead Jennings is also a doctor and a rower, who qualified for the 2016 Olympics.  They have four children.

References
 
 

1975 births
Living people
Irish male rowers
Sportspeople from Limerick (city)
Rowers at the 1996 Summer Olympics
Rowers at the 2004 Summer Olympics
Olympic rowers of Ireland
World Rowing Championships medalists for Ireland
People educated at Ardscoil Rís, Limerick
21st-century Irish people